Georges River College Hurstville Boys Campus, (formerly known as Hurstville Boys' High School and known as HBHS), is situated in the city of Hurstville in the Sydney region. The school caters for the educational needs of boys in the area of St. George.

History
From 2001 the school became a Years 7-10 campus of the Georges River College. Students who finish Year 10 move on to the Georges River College Oatley Senior Campus.

Notable alumni
 Sir Jack Brabham

References

External links
Hurstville Boys' Campus - Georges River College

Boys' schools in New South Wales
Educational institutions established in 1928
Public high schools in Sydney
1928 establishments in Australia
Hurstville, New South Wales